Coosa is an unincorporated community in Floyd County, Georgia, United States. Coosa has a post office with ZIP code 30129, which opened on December 28, 1846. An early variant name was "Missionary Station".

References

Unincorporated communities in Floyd County, Georgia
Unincorporated communities in Georgia (U.S. state)